The Allaikha (Allayıaxa) is a river of Sakha Republic, Russia, a left hand tributary of the Indigirka.

Course
The Allaikha has its source in the northern slopes of the Polousny Range at the Swan Lake, in the confluence of two small rivers, Fena (Фена) and Elikcheen (Эликчээн). It flows meandering roughly northeastwards across the Yana-Indigirka Lowland.

There are more than four thousand lakes in the basin of the Allaikha. Its most important tributary is the Ot-Yuryakh from the left.

See also
List of mammoth specimens
List of rivers of Russia

References

Rivers of the Sakha Republic